Viganj is a village located in the west of the Pelješac peninsula in southern Dalmatia, Croatia, by the Adriatic Sea, between Nakovana and Kućište. It has a population of 283.

Because the Maestral wind is common in summer time, Viganj is a tourist resort known for its windsurfing opportunities. Windsurfing competitions are regularly held in Viganj.

References

External links 
 

Populated places in Dubrovnik-Neretva County